ČSA Flight 511 was a flight operated by an Ilyushin Il-18 that crashed near Casablanca-Anfa Airport in Morocco on July 12, 1961. All 72 people on board were killed. The cause of the crash remains undetermined.

On March 28, 1961 another Ilyushin Il-18 operating on the same flight, ČSA OK-511, crashed near Nuremberg, Germany, killing all 52 passengers and crew on board.

References

Aviation accidents and incidents in 1961
1961 in Czechoslovakia
Accidents and incidents involving the Ilyushin Il-18
511
Aviation accidents and incidents in Morocco
July 1961 events in Africa
1961 in Morocco
1961 disasters in Morocco